Mohicanville is an unincorporated community in Ashland County, in the U.S. state of Ohio.

History
Mohicanville was laid out in 1833. The community takes its name from the nearby Mohican River. A post office called Mohican was established in 1837, and remained in operation until 1907.

References

Unincorporated communities in Ashland County, Ohio
1833 establishments in Ohio
Populated places established in 1833
Unincorporated communities in Ohio